Wolfgang Stegmüller (June 3, 1923 – June 11, 1991) was a German-Austrian philosopher who made important contributions in philosophy of science and analytic philosophy.

Biography
W. Stegmüller studied economics and philosophy at the University of Innsbruck. In 1944 he graduated as "Diplom-Volkswirt" and one year later he obtained a PhD in economics. Also at the University of Innsbruck he obtained in 1947 a PhD in philosophy with the thesis Erkenntnis und Sein in der modernen Ontologie mit besonderer Berücksichtigung der Erkenntnismetaphysik Nicolai Hartmanns: eine kritische Untersuchung. In 1949 he habilitated with the thesis Sein, Wahrheit und Wert in der heutigen Philosophie.

After a stay of one year at the University of Oxford in 1954 he returned to the University of Innsbruck where he was appointed as associate professor for philosophy in 1956. After stays as visiting professor at the Universities of Kiel and Bonn he received a call from the Ludwig Maximilian University of Munich. Here in 1958 he was appointed professor for philosophy, logic, and philosophy of sciences and became director of the "Seminar II". Except for two stays at as a visiting professor in 1962/63 and 1964 at the University of Pennsylvania he remained in Munich and ran there a center for analytical philosophy until his retirement in 1990. From 1977 to 1979 he also was dean of the faculty for philosophy, philosophy of science, and statistics.

Stegmüller was from 1966 on a corresponding member of the Austrian Academy of Sciences and from 1967 on a member of the Bavarian Academy of Sciences and Humanities. 1972 he became a member of the French Institut International de Philosophie, located in Paris. He also was a member of the International Academy of Science, Munich founded in 1980. In 1989 W. Stegmüller was awarded an honorary doctorate from the University of Innsbruck. After his retirement he was elected as honorary president of the Gesellschaft für Analytische Philosophie (Society for Analytical Philosophy).

Work
Stegmüller can be credited with essential contributions to the dissemination of ideas of analytical philosophy and philosophy of science in the German-speaking world. In his inaugural lecture at the University of Innsbruck, he outlined the four problems in epistemology, which he focussed on in his later work:

 The problem of induction
 The fundamental role of experience
 The problem of theoretical concepts
 The problem of scientific explanation

Logic
In his books Das Wahrheitsproblem und die Idee der Semantik (The Problem of Truth and the idea of Semantics, 1957), and Unvollständigkeit und Unentscheidbarkeit (Incompleteness and Undecidability, 1959) Stegmüller disseminated the ideas of Alfred Tarski and Rudolf Carnap on semantics and logics as well as those of Kurt Gödel on mathematical logic. Later similar works are on Die Antinomien und ihre Behandlung (Antinomies and Their Treatment, 1955) as well as Strukturtypen der Logik (Types of Structures of Logic, 1961).

Epistemology
One of the most influential books of Stegmüller is Metaphysik, Skepsis, Wissenschaft (1954). In this work, he discusses the epistemological foundations of metaphysics, scepticism, and science. He demonstrates that any search for epistemological fundamentals will necessarily lead to the problem of the evidence — which Stegmüller does not regard as solvable. He also refuses the potential solution that universal skepticism is self-refuting. Even if it were self-refuting, universal skepticism can be stated if the skeptic does not try to justify it. In consequence, explicit conditions (Evidenzvoraussetzungen) are necessary in metaphysics as well as in science. This means that neither can be fundamentally justified but do presuppose a decision.

A further focus of Stegmüller's work was phenomenalism. In "Der Phänomenalismus und seine Schwierigkeiten" (1958), he describes the extreme problems, which hinder a stringent implementation of the phenomenalism program.

Philosophy of science
Stegmüller is regarded as one of the leading philosophers of science of the second half of the 20th century. Deeply influenced by Thomas S. Kuhn and Joseph D. Sneed, he and several co-workers expanded upon the ideas of Sneed in order to overcome the prevalent rationality crisis of the science that was often regarded as a consequence of Kuhn's works. Furthermore, this led him to a new answer to the problems of theoretical concepts. This line of investigations is today known as the "structural theory of the empirical sciences".

Selected publications
Das Wahrheitsproblem und die Idee der Semantik, 1957
Unvollständigkeit und Unentscheidbarkeit, 1959
Einheit und Problematik der wissenschaftlichen Welterkenntnis, 1967
Metaphysik-Skepsis-Wissenschaft, 1969
Probleme und Resultate der Wissenschafttheorie und Analytischen Philosophie
Band I, Erklärung-Begründung-Kausalität, 1983
Band II, Theorie und Erfahrung, 1974
1. Teilband: Theorie und Erfahrung, 1974
2. Teilband: Theorienstrukturen und Theoriendynamik, 1985
3. Teilband: Die Entwicklung des neuen Strukturalismus seit 1973, 1986
Band III, Strukturtypen der Logik, 1984
Band IV, Personelle und statistische Wahrscheinlichkeit, 1973
1. Halbband: Personelle Wahrscheinlichkeit und rationale Entscheidung, 1973
2. Halbband: Statistisches Schließen - Statistische Begründung - Statistische Analyse, 1973
Das Problem der Induktion: Humes Herausforderung und moderne Antworten, 1975 
Rationale Rekonstruktion von Wissenschaft und ihrem Wandel, 1979  
The Structuralists View of Theories, 1979
Aufsätze zur Wissenschaftstheorie, 1980
Philosophy of economics, 1982
 Kripkes Deutung der Spätphilosophie Wittgensteins. Kommentarversuch über einen versuchten Kommentar. 1986
Hauptströmungen der Gegenwartsphilosophie, Bd. I-IV, Kröner, 7. Auflage (1989),

References

Further reading
C. G. Hempel, H. Putnam, W. K. Essler (eds.): Methodology, Epistemology, and Philosophy of Science: Essays in Honour of Wolfgang Stegmüller on the Occasion of his 60th Birth Day, June 3rd, 1983. Reprinted from the Journal Erkenntnis, Vol. 19, Nos 1, 2 and 3. Springer Verlag (1983)  	
R. Kleinknecht: Nachruf auf Wolfgang Stegmüller (two years after he died), Journal for General Philosophy of Science, Vol. 24, 1–16, (1993)
T. Perrone: La dinamica delle teorie scientifiche. Strutturalismo ed interpretazione logico-formale dell'epistemologia di Kuhn, Franco Angeli (2012) 

1923 births
1991 deaths
20th-century German philosophers
20th-century Austrian philosophers
Analytic philosophers
Philosophers of science
German male writers
Austrian emigrants to Germany